Stephen Whyte or Steven Whyte may refer to:

Stephen Whyte, High Sheriff of Limerick City
Steven Whyte, sculptor
Steve Whyte, Australian professional footballer

See also
Stephen White (disambiguation)
Steven White (disambiguation)
Steve White (disambiguation)